McWeeney is a surname. Notable people with the surname include:

 James McWeeney (1866-1940), American football coach
 Henry Charles McWeeney (1867-1935), Irish mathematician and university vice president

See also
 McWeeny